The Tropical Bowl is a college football postseason all-star game played annually in Florida in January since 2016. Initially played as the Tropic Bowl, it has used its current name since the January 2017 game.

Game results

Alumni
Over 350 Tropical Bowl alumni have gone on to the NFL since its inception. The game's website lists various notable players who have appeared in the Tropical Bowl, including: Andrew Dowell, Danny Etling, J. T. Hassell, Wil Lutz, Scotty Miller, and Kenny Moore.

See also
 Tropical Bowl (HBCUs), an unrelated team-competitive bowl game of the 1950s

References

External links
 

Recurring sporting events established in 2016
2016 establishments in Florida
College football all-star games
Sports competitions in Florida
American football in Florida